Fiorenzo Carpi (19 October 1918 – 21 May 1997) was an Italian composer and pianist, probably best known for the "Pinocchio" theme.

Biography

Born in Milan as Fiorenzo Carpi De Resmini, in 1945 he graduated at the Milan Conservatory, pupil of Arrigo Pedrollo and Giorgio Federico Ghedini; then he was a stable member of Piccolo Teatro di Milano since its founding (1947). He also collaborated with the Nobel laureate playwright Dario Fo on all his plays between 1953 and 1967, then sporadically until Carpi's death in 1997.  Fo's 1997 play Il diavolo con le zinne (The Devil with Boobs) featured an homage to Carpi following his death.

Carpi was a prolific film score composer, well known for his long collaboration with the director Luigi Comencini. In 1981 he won the David di Donatello for Best Score for Comencini's Voltati Eugenio. He also composed numerous pop songs, television scores, commercial jingles, symphonic and chamber opera works.

Selected filmography

 Fugitive in Trieste (1951)
 Zazie dans le Métro (1960)
 Leoni al sole (1961)
 A Very Private Affair (1962)
 Parigi o cara (1962)
 I cuori infranti (1963)
 I 4 tassisti (1963)
 Misunderstood (1966)
 Death on the Run (1967)
 Italian Secret Service (1968)
 Giacomo Casanova: Childhood and Adolescence (1969)
 The Howl (1970)
 Splendori e miserie di Madame Royale (1970)
 Million Dollar Eel (1971)
 A White Dress for Marialé (1972)
 The Adventures of Pinocchio (1972)
 Without Family (1972)
 Till Marriage Do Us Part (1974)
 Simona (1974)
 La Chair de l'orchidée (1975)
 Salon Kitty (1976)
 Traffic Jam (1979)
 Voltati Eugenio (1980)
 Piso pisello (1981)
 The Wounded Man (1983)
 Cuori nella tormenta (1984)
 La Storia (1986)
 Italian Night (1987)
 Merry Christmas... Happy New Year (1989)
 The Amusements of Private Life (1990)
 The End Is Known (1993)

Further reading

References

External links
 
 Fiorenzo Carpi at Discogs

1918 births
1997 deaths
Italian film score composers
Italian male film score composers
Musicians from Milan
David di Donatello winners
20th-century pianists
20th-century Italian composers
Italian male pianists
20th-century Italian male musicians
Ciak d'oro winners